Sarah Megan Thomas is an American actress, writer, director, and producer who has established herself as a filmmaker by  creating original and prestigious fare, featuring complex roles for women. Sarah created the concept, co-wrote the story, produced, and starred in the critically well-received Sony Pictures Classics film Equity, which premiered at Sundance and was a New York Times Critic's Pick when released theatrically nationwide.

In 2020 Sarah released the feature film, A Call to Spy, which she wrote, produced, and starred in as the  legendary American spy, Virginia Hall. The film was well received, providing "fuel to the specialty box office” in a pandemic landscape. It was awarded the 2020 Anti-Defamation League "Stand Up" Award as part of the film's premiere at the Santa Barbara International Film Festival. IndieWire praised the film, noting her performance in particular by saying "Sarah Megan Thomas is the standout." In 2017, Fortune selected Sarah for their "Most Powerful Women, Next Generation" list, featuring her as a panelist in their annual summit.

Early life and education
From Haverford, Pennsylvania on the Philadelphia Main Line, Thomas participated in theater at the Shipley School, and was a keen participant in sports such as cross-country, basketball, and rowing. As an undergraduate at Williams College acting became her primary focus and she completed studies overseas at Drama Studio London and the Royal Academy of Dramatic Art. A move to New York to pursue on-screen and off-Broadway jobs followed.

Career

Theater 
Classically trained, Sarah starred Off- Broadway as Berowne(a) in the gender- reversed Loves Labour's Lost. She starred as Eva Braun in the Off-Broadway hit, Summit Conference, extended due to popular demand.

Film and Television 
Thomas wrote, produced, and starred in the 2012 film Backwards, a rowing-centered romance with James Van Der Beek in which Thomas plays an Olympic hopeful who fails to make it to compete in the Rowing at the Summer Olympics and returns home instead to coach on the Schuylkill River. The film used footage from the actual The Stotesbury Regatta, the worlds oldest high school rowing competition. When she was a competing rower herself Thomas and her high school boat competed at the Henley Royal Regatta.

For 2016’s Equity, Thomas again had story and producer credits in addition to co-starring alongside Breaking Bad’s Anna Gunn. Equity was the first female driven Wall Street feature, and was praised for its assertive, female-first take on the traditionally man-heavy financial sector. The 2016 Sundance Film Festival selection was acquired by Sony Pictures Classics. Equity was bought by ABC to develop into a pilot with Sarah Executive Producing alongside Amy Pascal.

Thomas started researching the secret British World War II organization the Special Operations Executive (SOE), and the female agents they employed, whilst she was on the press tour for Equity in 2016, before talking to living relatives of the agents and analyzing the spy files of the agents. The resulting 2019 film, A Call to Spy, follows these Special Operations Executive agents who aided in the French Resistance against the Nazi regime and includes real life characters such as Virginia Hall, Vera Atkins, Noor Inayat Khan and Maurice Buckmaster. Written, produced and starring  Thomas as Virginia Hall, A Call to Spy was directed by Lydia Dean Pilcher. The Guardian described a ‘meticulous depiction of female war-time agents’ as Thomas portrays Hall’s rise through the spy ranks to being smuggled into the hub of the French resistance in Lyon in Vichy France. A Call To Spy was released by IFC Films domestically, and praised by the CIA for its technical accuracy. Internationally, Amazon acquired the film as an "Amazon Original" in India.

Thomas will be directing "Audrey's Children," a biopic about healthcare hero and Ronald McDonald House Co-Founder, Dr. Audrey Evans.

Filmography

Personal life
Her parents, Regina O’Brien Thomas and Frank M. Thomas Jr., are both lawyers. Her father has his own practice in Haverford. Her mother is a partner at a firm in Philadelphia. Sarah Megan Thomas was married to Jason Steven Donehue in May 31, 2008 at St. Mary's Roman Catholic Church (Philadelphia).

References

20th-century American actresses
People from Haverford Township, Pennsylvania
Alumni of the Drama Studio London
American film producers
American producers
Living people
Year of birth missing (living people)
21st-century American women